Rudy Gunawan (born 31 December 1966) is a former Indonesian badminton player who played between 1980s and 1990s. He is arguably one of the best doubles players ever to play for Indonesia. Rudy Gunawan won various international championships, both in the men's doubles and mixed doubles events. He has paired up with players such as Eddy Hartono, Rosiana Tendean, Bambang Suprianto, and Ricky Subagja. He was on the Thomas Cup team of Indonesia  five times (1988, 1990, 1992, 1994, and 1996) but only won gold in 1994 and 1996. In addition, he helped strengthen the Indonesian team in the race for 1989 Sudirman Cup.

Rudy twice competed in the Summer Olympics. In the 1992 Olympics, Rudy and Eddy won a silver medal following the defeat in the final match to South Korean pair Park Joo-bong and Kim Moon-soo. In the 1996 Olympics, Rudy and Bambang pair lost in the round of 16.

Career 
Rudy Gunawan was a member of world champion Indonesian Thomas Cup (men's international) teams in 1994 and 1996, winning his final round match on both occasions. He won men's doubles at the 1993 IBF World Championships in Birmingham, England with Ricky Subagja. However, he shared most of his international men's doubles titles with two other fellow countrymen, Eddy Hartono and Bambang Suprianto. These included the prestigious All-England title in 1992 and 1994, the World Badminton Grand Prix in 1990 and 1993, the Southeast Asian Games in 1991; as well as the Indonesia (1989, 1992, 1995), Dutch (1989, 1991), Singapore (1990), Thailand (1991, 1993), China (1993), Chinese Taipei (1994), and U.S. (1995) Opens. Gunawan was a silver medalist at the 1992 Olympics in Barcelona with Eddy Hartono. He also shared a number of international mixed doubles titles, including victories at the Indonesia (1990, 1993), Hong Kong (1993), Polish (1993) Opens and World Cup for 3 years running (1990 - 1991).

Achievements

Olympic Games 
Men's doubles

World Championships 
Men's doubles

World Cup 
Men's doubles

Mixed doubles

Asian Games 
Men's doubles

Mixed doubles

Asian Cup 
Men's doubles

Southeast Asian Games 
Men's doubles

Mixed doubles

IBF World Grand Prix (19 titles, 19 runners-up) 
The World Badminton Grand Prix, sanctioned by International Badminton Federation (IBF) from 1983 to 2006.

Men's doubles

Mixed doubles

 IBF Grand Prix tournament
 IBF Grand Prix Finals tournament

IBF International (1 title, 1 runner-up) 
Men's doubles

Mixed doubles

After badminton 
Gunawan retired from competitive badminton following the 1996 season, and turned to Christian ministry work in Indonesian villages. In 1999, he went to California for study and received a  B.A. degree in theology from Promise Christian University. He is currently serving as a senior pastor in both the Los Angeles and San Francisco areas. Although he has retired from the Indonesian badminton team, he has not retired from the sport. As of 2014, he currently is a coach at the Orange County Badminton Club located in Orange County, California and is also a coach of the USA national badminton team. Not only does the coach, but he is also a professional player, again making a comeback into professional badminton with partner Ryan Chew. As of 2015 he currently ranked 132 in men's doubles.

Family 
Gunawan married to Febijane N. Lumingkewas on 11 December 1992 and have 5 children; 4 boys and 1 girl.

His mother, Sally Young, was the daughter of Fifi Young an Indonesian actress of mixed French and Chinese  and Njoo Cheong Seng a Chinese-Indonesian playwright and film director.

References

External links 
 
 
 
 Miracle Center USA
 YouTube - Miracle Center USA

1966 births
Living people
People from Surakarta
Sportspeople from Central Java
Indonesian people of Chinese descent
Indonesian male badminton players
Badminton players at the 1992 Summer Olympics
Badminton players at the 1996 Summer Olympics
Olympic badminton players of Indonesia
Olympic silver medalists for Indonesia
Olympic medalists in badminton
Medalists at the 1992 Summer Olympics
Badminton players at the 1990 Asian Games
Badminton players at the 1994 Asian Games
Asian Games gold medalists for Indonesia
Asian Games bronze medalists for Indonesia
Asian Games medalists in badminton
Medalists at the 1990 Asian Games
Medalists at the 1994 Asian Games
Competitors at the 1989 Southeast Asian Games
Competitors at the 1991 Southeast Asian Games
Competitors at the 1993 Southeast Asian Games
Southeast Asian Games gold medalists for Indonesia
Southeast Asian Games silver medalists for Indonesia
Southeast Asian Games bronze medalists for Indonesia
Southeast Asian Games medalists in badminton
World No. 1 badminton players
Indonesian emigrants to the United States
American people of Chinese-Indonesian descent
Sportspeople from Los Angeles
Sportspeople from the San Francisco Bay Area
American male badminton players
American religious leaders